is a financial market information vendor headquartered in Tokyo, Japan. It was founded in 1971 as Quotation Information Center K.K. (株式会社市況情報センター), and changed its corporate name to the acronym "QUICK" in 1987. QUICK has four offices in Japan (Tokyo, Osaka, Nagoya and Fukuoka) as well as overseas offices in London and Hong Kong.

Services
QUICK developed one of the three major Japanese real-time news database services in the 1980s (along with Jiji News Wire and Nikkei Telecom).

QUICK is responsible for calculating several Japanese financial market indices, including the well-known Nikkei 225 stock market index. QUICK also publishes "QUICK Consensus" data based on corporate earnings and macroeconomic forecasts published by securities firms and analytics companies.

In 2016, QUICK introduced AI-based technology to automatically "read" corporate news releases and instantly generate news reports based on the contents. In the same year, QUICK announced a strategic equity investment in the US fintech startup Xignite, which provides cloud-based market data to financial institutions, with the goal of offering the technology to customers in Asia.

References

External links
QUICK Corp Website
Mintos Investment Review

Financial services companies established in 1971
Financial data vendors
Financial news agencies
Financial services companies of Japan
Nikkei Inc.
News agencies based in Japan
1971 establishments in Japan